is a village located in Kunigami District, Okinawa Prefecture, Japan.

As of 2013, the village had an estimated population of 10,443 and a population density of 210 persons per km². Unlike other areas of Japan, Onna has been in a sustained period of population growth in the post-war period. In 1965 the population of the village was 8,471, and by 2003 had grown to over 10,000 residents.

Onna is the site of the Okinawa Institute of Science and Technology, a research institute turned graduate university.

History

Onna was first established as Unna Magiri (恩納間切) in 1673 by the Ryukyu Kingdom. Ryukyu was annexed by Japan in 1879. In 1908, the Japanese government dissolved Unna Magiri and replaced it with Onna Village.

The village is the site of the tomb of the Republic of China statesman Fang Chih, founder and Chairman of the Sino-Ryukyuan Cultural and Economic Association.

Geography

Onna is located in the central part of Okinawa Island, and occupies a long, narrow stretch of the western coast of the island. The village spans  from north to south but only  from east to west. The village is located in the rugged Sekiryo Mountains that run from the north to central Okinawa Island, with Mount Onna being the highest point in the village. Settlements in the village are located in the few flatter areas.

The coastal areas of Onna was declared part of Okinawa Kaigan Quasi-National Park in 1972 after the reversion of Okinawa Prefecture to Japan. Onna is noted for its coastal scenery, notably Cape Manzamō and Cape Maeda.

Neighboring Municipalities
Onna borders on six other municipalities in Okinawa prefecture.
 Nakadomari
 Nago
 City of Okinawa
 Uruma
 Kin
 Ginoza
 Yomitan

Economy
Since World War II Onna has been a small-scale center of sugarcane production but tourists from mainland Japan, China, Taiwan, S. Korea, Australia and many other countries stay in one of the many seaside resorts that have been built just before, and after, the beginning of the new millennium. In recent years pineapples and mikan, or satsuma mandarin, have been grown in the rugged hill areas of the village. Like other municipalities on Okinawa Island, cut flowers and greenhouse vegetables intended for the Japanese homelands have become important agricultural products.

Tourism also plays an increasingly important part of the Onna, Okinawa economy and has grown significantly in the last decade. 
Resort hotels were built along the coastal areas in Onna after the reversion of Okinawa Prefecture to Japan in 1972, and tourism remains and important part of the economy of the village and the Onna prefecture.

Transportation

Roads

Onna is crossed by Japan National Route 58, which connects the village of Kunigami in the north of Okinawa to the prefectural capital of Naha in the south. Okinawa Prefectural Route 6 intersects Route 58 at Nakadomari Village and passes through the village before intersecting with 58 again at the north end of Nakadomari. Route 73 runs east–west through the narrowest portion of Okinawa and connects Nakadomari Village on the East China Sea (west) coast to Ishikawa on the Pacific (east) coast. Prefectural Routes 86 and 104 connect the north of Onna with the town of Kin.

Onna Road Map on Google Maps

Education
Schools include:
 Unna Junior High School (うんな中学校)

Notable people
Onna Nabe, ryuka poet

References

External links

 Onna-son Prefecture on Google Maps
 Onna official website 

 
Villages in Okinawa Prefecture
Populated coastal places in Japan